Vice Admiral Cuthbert Collingwood, 1st Baron Collingwood (26 September 1748 – 7 March 1810) was an admiral of the Royal Navy, notable as a partner with Lord Nelson in several of the British victories of the Napoleonic Wars, and frequently as Nelson's successor in commands.

Early years

Collingwood was born in Newcastle upon Tyne. His early education was at the Royal Grammar School, Newcastle. At the age of 12, he went to sea as a volunteer on board the sixth-rate  under the command of his cousin Captain Richard Brathwaite (or Braithwaite), who took charge of his nautical education.

In 1777, Collingwood met Horatio Nelson when both served on the frigate . Nelson had been the leader of a failed expedition to cross Central America from the Atlantic Ocean to the Pacific Ocean by navigating boats along the San Juan River, Lake Nicaragua and Lake Leon. Nelson was debilitated by disease and had to recover before being promoted to a larger vessel, and Collingwood succeeded him in command of Hinchinbrook and brought the remainder of the expedition back to Jamaica.

Major command

In 1786, Collingwood returned to England, where, with the exception of a voyage to the West Indies, he remained until 1793. On 16 June 1791, Collingwood married Sarah Blackett, daughter of the Newcastle merchant and politician John Erasmus Blackett.

On board HMS Excellent he participated in the victory of the Battle of Cape St Vincent in 1797, establishing a good reputation in the fleet for his conduct during the battle. After blockading Cadiz, he returned for a few weeks to Portsmouth to repair. Collingwood continued to be actively employed in blockading the enemy until the Peace of Amiens allowed him to return to England.

With the resumption of hostilities with France in the spring of 1803 he left home, never to return. First he blockaded the French fleet off Brest. In 1804 he was promoted to vice-admiral (of the Blue 23 April 1804; of the Red 9 November 1805). Nearly two years were spent off Brest in anticipation for Napoleon's planned invasion of the United Kingdom. When the French fleet sailed from Toulon, Admiral Collingwood was appointed to command a squadron, with orders to pursue them. The combined fleets of France and Spain, after sailing to the West Indies, returned to Cadiz. On their way they encountered Collingwood's small squadron off Cadiz. He had only three ships with him; but he succeeded in avoiding their pursuit, although chased by 16 ships of the line. Before half of the enemy's force had entered the harbour he resumed the blockade, using false signals to disguise the small size of his squadron. He was soon joined by Nelson who hoped to lure the combined fleet into a major engagement.

Battle of Trafalgar

The combined fleet sailed from Cadiz in October 1805. The Battle of Trafalgar immediately followed. Villeneuve, the French admiral, drew up his fleet in the form of a crescent. Royal Sovereign was the swifter sailer, mainly because its hull had been given a new layer of copper which lacked the friction of old, well used copper and thus was much faster. Having drawn considerably ahead of the rest of the fleet, she was the first engaged. "See", said Nelson, pointing to Royal Sovereign as she penetrated the centre of the enemy's line, "see how that noble fellow Collingwood carries his ship into action!" Probably it was at the same moment that Collingwood, as if in response to the observation of his great commander, remarked to his captain, "What would Nelson give to be here?"

Royal Sovereign closed with the Spanish admiral's ship and fired her broadsides with such rapidity and precision at Santa Ana that the Spanish ship was on the verge of sinking almost before another British ship had fired a gun. Several other vessels came to Santa Anas assistance and hemmed in Royal Sovereign on all sides; the latter, after being severely damaged, was relieved by the arrival of the rest of the British squadron, but was left unable to manoeuvre. Not long afterwards Santa Ana struck her colours. 

On the death of Nelson, Collingwood assumed his position as commander-in-chief, transferring his flag to the frigate HMS Euryalus. Knowing that a severe storm was in the offing, Nelson had intended that the fleet should anchor after the battle, but Collingwood chose not to issue such an order: many of the British ships and prizes were so damaged that they were unable to anchor, and Collingwood concentrated efforts on taking damaged vessels in tow.  In the ensuing gale, many of the prizes were wrecked on the rocky shore and others were destroyed to prevent their recapture, though no British ship was lost.

On 9 November 1805, Collingwood was raised to the peerage as Baron Collingwood, of Caldburne and Hethpool in the County of Northumberland. He also received the thanks of both Houses of Parliament and was awarded a pension of £2000 per annum. Together with all Trafalgar captains and admirals, he also received a Naval Gold Medal, his third, after those for the Glorious First of June and Cape St Vincent. 

Only Nelson and Sir Edward Berry share the distinction of three gold medals for service during the wars against France.

When not at sea he resided at Collingwood House in the town of Morpeth which lies some 15 miles north of Newcastle upon Tyne and Chirton Hall in Chirton, now a western suburb of North Shields. He is known to have remarked, "whenever I think how I am to be happy again, my thoughts carry me back to Morpeth."

Later career
From Trafalgar until his death no great naval action was fought and, although several small French fleets would attempt to run the blockade, and one successfully landed troops in the Caribbean two months after Trafalgar, the majority were hunted down and overwhelmed in battle. Collingwood was occupied in important political and diplomatic transactions in the Mediterranean, in which he displayed tact and judgement. He requested to be relieved of his command of the fleet so that he might return home, however the government urgently required an admiral with the experience and skill of Collingwood to remain, on the grounds that his country could not dispense with his services in the face of the still potent threat that the French and their allies could pose. His health began to decline alarmingly in 1809 and he was forced to again request the Admiralty to allow him to return home, which was finally granted. Collingwood died as a result of cancer on board , off Port Mahon as he sailed for England, on 7 March 1810. He was laid to rest beside Nelson in the crypt of St Paul's Cathedral.

Evaluation

Collingwood's merits as a naval officer were in many respects of the first order. His political judgement was remarkable and he was consulted on questions of general policy, of regulation, and even of trade. He was opposed to impressment and to flogging and was considered so kind and generous that he was called "father" by the common sailors. Nelson and Collingwood enjoyed a close friendship, from their first acquaintance in early life until Nelson's death at Trafalgar; and they are both entombed in St Paul's Cathedral. As Collingwood died without male issue, his barony became extinct at his death.

Thackeray held that there was no better example of a virtuous Christian Knight than Collingwood. Dudley Pope relates an aspect of Collingwood at the beginning of chapter three of his Life in Nelson's Navy: "Captain Cuthbert Collingwood, later to become an admiral and Nelson's second in command at Trafalgar, had his home at Morpeth, in Northumberland, and when he was there on half pay or on leave he loved to walk over the hills with his dog Bounce. He always started off with a handful of acorns in his pockets, and as he walked he would press an acorn into the soil whenever he saw a good place for an oak tree to grow. Some of the oaks he planted are probably still growing more than a century and a half later ready to be cut to build ships of the line at a time when nuclear submarines are patrolling the seas, because Collingwood's purpose was to make sure that the Navy would never want for oaks to build the fighting ships upon which the country's safety depended." Collingwood once wrote to his wife that he'd rather his body be added to Britain's sea defences rather than given the pomp of a ceremonial burial.

Sailor Robert Hay who served with Collingwood wrote that: "He and his dog Bounce were known to every member of the crew. How attentive he was to the health and comfort and happiness of his crew! A man who could not be happy under him, could have been happy nowhere; a look of displeasure from him was as bad as a dozen at the gangway from another man". and that:  "a better seaman, a better friend to seamen - a more zealous defender of the country's rights and honour, never trod the quarterdeck."

Descriptions

Literature

Letitia Elizabeth Landon celebrates the Admiral in her poetical illustration Admiral Lord Collingwood in Fisher's Drawing Room Scrap Book, 1833. This is to an engraving of a variation on the painting by Henry Howard, apparently by his son Frank Howard.

Collingwood is fictionalized as "Admiral Sir John Thornton" in Patrick O'Brian's "The Ionian Mission."

Collingwood appears in Hornblower and the Atropos when Hornblower's ship joins the Mediterranean fleet a few months after Trafalgar.

Memorials

The town of Collingwood, Ontario, on Georgian Bay in Canada, the suburb of Collingwood in the Australian city of Melbourne, the town of Collingwood, New Zealand and the Collingwood Channel (an entrance of Howe Sound near Vancouver, British Columbia), are named in his honour.

A large monument, The Collingwood Monument, stands in his honour and overlooks the River Tyne at Tynemouth. His Grade II listed statue was sculpted by John Graham Lough and stands atop a pedestal designed by John Dobson. The four cannon on the walls flanking the steps at its base came from his flagship, Royal Sovereign.

A battalion of the Royal Naval Division (1914 to 1919) was named after Collingwood. It took part in the Antwerp Campaign (October 1914) and at Gallipoli. The Collingwood Battalion received so many casualties at the 3rd battle of Krithia, Gallipoli, on 4 June 1915 that it never reformed.

One of the four houses at Collingwood's old school the Royal Grammar School, Newcastle, is named after him. One of the five houses of British public school Churcher's College is named after him, as is one of the eleven houses at The Royal Hospital School. One of the three secondary Schools within Excelsior Academy in Newcastle was named after Collingwood in 2013.

March 2010 saw the 200th anniversary of Collingwood's death and a number of major events were organised by 'Collingwood 2010' on Tyneside, in Morpeth and the island of Menorca.

Collingwood's residence in Es Castell close to Mahon, Menorca is now a hotel and home to a collection of heirlooms relating to his time on the island.

From 1978 until 1992, British Rail locomotive 50005 was named Collingwood. In November 2005, English, Welsh & Scottish named locomotive 90020 Collingwood at Newcastle station.

References

Further reading 
 Mackesy, Piers. "Collingwood in the Mediterranean." History Today (March 1960), Vol. 10 Issue 3, p202-210. 
 Adams, Max. Admiral Collingwood - Nelson's Own Hero, Phoenix, London, 2005, .
The Trafalgar Captains, Colin White and the 1805 Club, Chatham Publishing, London, 2005, .
The Naval Chronicle Volume 15, 1806. J. Gold, London (reissued by Cambridge University Press, 2010. ).
 Oxford Dictionary of National Biography. Article on Collingwood at Volume 12, pages 670–5. Oxford University Press, 2004, 
 A Fine Old English Gentleman exemplified in the Life and Character of Lord Collingwood, a Biographical Study, by William Davies (London, 1875).

External links 

Collingwood 2010 website

Dictionary of National Biography, 1885. Entry on Collingwood, Volume XII, pages 357-362
Royal Navy Museum page about Collingwood
Animation of the Battle of Trafalgar
Service at the Collingwood Monument Tynemouth. Video
The College Valley where Collingwood planted his acorns
A selection from the public and private correspondence of Vice-Admiral Lord Collingwood; interspersed with memoirs of his life (Vol 1)
A selection from the public and private correspondence of Vice-Admiral Lord Collingwood; interspersed with memoirs of his life (Vol 2)

|-

Royal Navy vice admirals
Royal Navy personnel of the American Revolutionary War
Royal Navy personnel of the French Revolutionary Wars
British naval commanders of the Napoleonic Wars
Barons in the Peerage of the United Kingdom
Peers of the United Kingdom created by George III
Military personnel from Newcastle upon Tyne
Burials at St Paul's Cathedral
1748 births
1810 deaths
People educated at the Royal Grammar School, Newcastle upon Tyne